Bob Lake is a Republican former member of the Montana Legislature.  He was elected for Senate District 44, representing the Hamilton, Montana area, in 2010.  He previously served in the House of Representatives from 2003-2011.

In 2012 he was elected to the Montana Public Service Commission, representing District 4.

References

External links
 Home page

Living people
1938 births
Republican Party Montana state senators
People from Ronan, Montana
Republican Party members of the Montana House of Representatives
People from Hamilton, Montana